Phelsuma hoeschi is a species of gecko endemic to the Atsinanana Region of Madagascar.

References

Phelsuma
Endemic fauna of Madagascar
Reptiles of Madagascar
Reptiles described in 2009